Ejgayehu Taye (born 10 February 2000) is an Ethiopian Olympic long-distance runner. She won the bronze medal for the 3000 metres at the 2022 World Indoor Championships. Taye is the current world record holder in the 5 km road race.

Career
In July 2018, Ejgayehu Taye won the silver medal in the 5000 metres at the 2018 IAAF World U20 Championships in Tampere behind Beatrice Chebet and ahead of Taye's compatriot Tsigie Gebreselama.

She placed fifth over the 5000m at the 2019 African Games.

In June 2021, she set a new personal best of 14:14.09 in her specialist event as she finished second in the Ethiopian Olympic trials behind Gudaf Tsegay and ahead of Senbere Teferi to secure her place for the delayed 2020 Tokyo Olympics. At the Games, Taye placed fifth in the women's 5000m final.

On 31 December 2021, in her second road race as a professional, Taye set a world record in the 5 km run at the Cursa dels Nassos 5K in Barcelona (mixed race) in a time of 14 minutes 19 seconds, improving previous mark by 20 seconds. She had 45 second margin of victory.

She won the bronze medal in the 3000 metres at the 2022 World Indoor Championships in Belgrade with a time of 8:42.23. Her compatriot Lemlem Hailu took gold in 8:41.82 while second-placed Elle Purrier St. Pierre clocked 8:42.04. Taye ran 14:21 at the Cursa dels Nassos 5K on New Year's Eve trying to improve her own world record, the second-fastest mark in history.

Achievements

International competitions

Circuit wins
 Diamond League
 2022: Eugene Prefontaine Classic (5000m)

Personal bests
 3000 metres – 8:19.52 (Paris 2021) 
 3000 metres indoor – 8:26.77 (Liévin 2022)
 5000 metres – 14:12.98 (Eugene, OR 2022)
 10,000 metres – 30:12.45 (Eugene, OR 2022)
Road
 5 km – 14:19 (Barcelona 2021) World record (mixed race)
 10 km – 33:31 (Saarbrücken 2018)

References

External links

2000 births
Living people
Ethiopian female long-distance runners
Athletes (track and field) at the 2020 Summer Olympics
Olympic athletes of Ethiopia
World Athletics Indoor Championships medalists
21st-century Ethiopian women